Patriarch Peter II of Alexandria (died 27 February 381)  was the 21st Patriarch of Alexandria from AD 373 to AD 381. He was a disciple of Athanasius of Alexandria who designated him as his successor before his death in 373.

He was a zealous opponent of Arianism and immediately after his consecration, the prefect Palladius, acting on orders from Emperor Valens drove him from the city and installed Lucius, an adherent of Arianism as bishop.

Peter found refuge at Rome, where Pope Damasus I (AD 366- AD 384) received him and gave him support against the Arians. In 373, Peter returned to Alexandria, where Lucius yielded out of fear of the populace.

References
General

Specific

4th-century Popes and Patriarchs of Alexandria
4th-century Christian saints
381 deaths